Jason Teller (born: 6 October 1972) is a sailor from Barbados. who represented his country at the 1992 Summer Olympics in Barcelona, Spain as crew member in the Soling. With helmsman Richard Hoad and fellow crew member David Staples they took the 22nd place.

References

Living people
1972 births
Sportspeople from London
People from Paddington
Sailors at the 1992 Summer Olympics – Soling
Olympic sailors of Barbados
Barbadian male sailors (sport)